Robert Alexander Prichard (October 21, 1917 – September 25, 1991) was a first baseman in Major League Baseball. He played for the Washington Senators.

References

External links

1917 births
1991 deaths
Baseball players from Texas
Charlotte Hornets (baseball) players
Greenville Spinners players
Indianapolis Indians players
Major League Baseball first basemen
Montgomery Rebels players
Paris Panthers players
Paris Red Peppers players
People from Paris, Texas
Sanford Lookouts players
Shreveport Sports players
Springfield Nationals players
Washington Senators (1901–1960) players